Litophasia is a genus of flies in the family Tachinidae.

Species
L. hyalipennis (Fallén, 1815) (Europe)
L. sulcifacies Dear, 1980 (South Africa)

References

Phasiinae
Diptera of Europe
Diptera of Africa
Tachinidae genera
Taxa named by Ernst August Girschner